Tyler Dean Wade (born November 23, 1994) is an American professional baseball utility player in the Oakland Athletics organization. He made his Major League Baseball debut for the New York Yankees in 2017 and has also played in MLB for the Los Angeles Angels in 2022.

Amateur career
Wade attended Murrieta Valley High School in Murrieta, California. The New York Yankees selected Wade in the fourth round of the 2013 Major League Baseball draft. He had committed to play college baseball at San Diego State University, but chose to forgo his commitment and sign with the Yankees, for a $371,300 signing bonus.

Professional career

New York Yankees

Wade made his professional debut with the Gulf Coast Yankees of the Rookie-level Gulf Coast League. Near the end of the season, after batting .309/.429/.370 with 12 RBIs,  he was promoted to the Staten Island Yankees of the Class A-Short Season New York-Penn League where he played in four games. In 2014, Wade played for the Charleston RiverDogs of the Class A South Atlantic League where he posted a .272 batting average with one home run and 51 RBIs in 129 games. He started 2015 with the Tampa Yankees of the Class A-Advanced Florida State League and was promoted to the Trenton Thunder of Class AA Eastern League during the season. In 127 games between both clubs, he batted .262 with three home runs and 31 RBIs.

Wade received a non-roster invitation to spring training by the Yankees in 2016, but spent the season with Trenton. Wade finished 2016 batting .259 with five home runs and 27 RBIs in 133 games.

Due to an injury to Didi Gregorius, Wade competed to earn a spot on the Yankees' 25-man roster in spring training in 2017. Wade began the 2017 season with the Scranton/Wilkes-Barre RailRiders of the Class AAA International League. The Yankees promoted Wade to the major leagues on June 27. He was recalled and optioned multiple times during the season before being recalled for the remainder of the season on September 4. In 85 games for the RailRiders he batted .310 with seven home runs and 31 RBIs, and in 30 games for the Yankees, he slashed .155/.222/.224.

On March 28, 2018, Wade announced via Instagram that he would be wearing number 12 for the upcoming 2018 Major League Baseball season, which was worn by third baseman Chase Headley the previous year. He began the season with the Yankees. In the first game of the 2018 season, Wade pinch hit for second baseman Neil Walker, but grounded out. The next day, Wade started at second base and got his first hit of the season, a 2-run double in the 6th inning. He was optioned to Scranton/Wilkes-Barre on April 22.

Wade was not on the Yankees' Opening Day roster in 2019 despite also covering as a center fielder. As of August 31, however, he was added back into the squad to cover shortstop, third base and second base due to Thairo Estrada's and Gio Urshela's injuries. He finished the 2019 season hitting .245/.330/.362 with two home runs and 11 RBIs in 108 plate appearances. In the shortened 2020 season, Wade hit .170/.288/.307 with 3 home runs and 10 RBIs in 52 games.

Los Angeles Angels
On November 19, 2021, the Yankees designated Wade for assignment. The Yankees traded Wade to the Los Angeles Angels for a player to be named later (PTBNL) or cash considerations on November 22. 
In 67 games with the Angels, Wade batted .218/.272/.272 with 8 RBIs. He was designated for assignment on July 3, 2022. He was unclaimed on waivers and the Angels sent him outright to the Salt Lake Bees of the Triple-A Pacific Coast League.

New York Yankees (second stint)
The Angels traded Wade to the Yankees for a PTBNL or cash considerations on July 14, 2022. He elected free agency on October 6, 2022.

Oakland Athletics
On October 28, 2022, the Oakland Athletics and Wade agreed to a minor league contract.

Personal life 
Wade first visited New York when he played a tournament at the Old Yankee Stadium when he was 11 years old.  Ever since, he has been a New York Yankees fan.

References

External links

Living people
1994 births
People from Murrieta, California
Baseball players from California
Major League Baseball infielders
New York Yankees players
Los Angeles Angels players
Gulf Coast Yankees players
Staten Island Yankees players
Charleston RiverDogs players
Tampa Yankees players
Trenton Thunder players
Surprise Saguaros players
Scottsdale Scorpions players
Scranton/Wilkes-Barre RailRiders players
Salt Lake Bees players